Caroline Lufkin (born January 9, 1981) is a Japanese-American musician and the younger sister of the Japanese pop singer Olivia Lufkin. Caroline's music been released by Temporary Residence Ltd. Caroline is also a full-time member of Mice Parade (FatCat Records).

Biography
Originally from Okinawa, Japan, Caroline Lufkin graduated from the Berklee School of Music in Boston in 2003. After graduating, she moved to Tokyo and began working on an album. Before signing with her current label, she had been working on an album in the Japanese music industry where she was being groomed to be a Japanese pop singer. However, she left because of differencing in views on her music stating that "they kept on telling me to change things and I didn't want to change them... They were trying to make the music super-pop and I couldn't quite deal with it." She made ripples across the Japanese pop music scene when she famously walked away from a lucrative major label contract that virtually guaranteed the same kind of bright-light super-stardom that had made her sister Olivia a household name in Tokyo.

Instead, Caroline decided to write, perform and records her own songs and owns began a search for indie labels. "Where's My Love?", her first song, was posted on her MySpace page in late 2004. She sent TRL an e-mail, asking if she could send in a demo, and included a link to her MySpace page. A few days later, Jeremy deVine, the founder and co-operator of the label, wanted to sign her to the label.

"Where's My Love?" was officially released as a single on October 25, 2005, but was also distributed during the previous month. On March 6, 2006, Caroline released her first album, Murmurs, and soon after held her first live show at the South by Southwest music festival in Austin, Texas, on March 17 at the Whisky Bar.

In 2007, Caroline was asked to join Mice Parade of FatCat Records. She is now a full-time and touring member of Mice Parade and appeared on their singles, "What It Means To Be Left-Handed" (2010) and "Candela" (2013). Caroline has also collaborated with many artists and bands including Saxon Shore ("This Place"), Her Space Holiday and Lite ("Arch" and "Time Machine").

Recently, Caroline released "Verdugo Hills" (2011) and "Verdugo Hills Remixes" (2012) through Temporary Residence Limited.

Caroline was also the voice of the Uniqlo Wake Up app for iOS, on which she collaborated with Yoko Kanno and Cornelius.

Discography
Albums
Murmurs CD - Temporary Residence Limited March 7, 2006
Murmurs Mixes iTunes digital album - Temporary Residence Limited January 8, 2008
Verdugo Hills CD / LP - January 2011
Verdugo Hills Remixes iTunes/LP - July 24, 2012

Collaborations
Saxon Shore - It Doesn't Matter LP ("This Place")
Mice Parade - What It Means to Be Left-Handed LP
Mice Parade - Candela LP
Mice Parade - Live: England vs. France
Lite - Past, Present, Future EP ("Arch", "Time Machine")
DJ Baku - Buddha Boy featuring Caroline
Island Bag - Stars in the Sand
Anamanaguchi -"Sunset by Plane" 2019
Mice Parade - "Eisa Dancers" December Single 2020
Mice Parade - Lapapọ LP

Background vocals
Her Space Holiday - Her Space Holiday ("Black Cat Balloons", "Shonanoka", "The Hummingbirds", "Come On All You Soldiers", "Death of a Writer")

Singles
"Where's My Love?" CD single - Temporary Residence Limited October 25, 2005
"Sunrise" CD single - Temporary Residence Limited October 2, 2006

Compilations
 TRL100: Thankful ("Wonderlust") CD - 2006, Temporary Residence Limited
 Destroy Independent Music! CD sampler - 2007, Temporary Residence Limited

References

External links
Official website
New Music magazine 2005 (Google books)
Caroline's Murmurs
Lufkin Sisters
The Milk Factory - review of Murmurs 2006
eMusician interview 2006
Dusted magazine feature 2005
Salon.com entry 2006
Juice Online interview 2008

1981 births
Living people
Berklee College of Music alumni
American women musicians of Japanese descent
American people of Okinawan descent
People from Okinawa Prefecture
Musicians from Okinawa Prefecture
21st-century Japanese women singers
21st-century Japanese singers
Temporary Residence Limited artists
Mice Parade members